The 1949 Harvard Crimson football team was an American football team that represented Harvard University during the 1949 college football season. In their second and final year under head coach Arthur Valpey, the Crimson compiled a 1–8 record and were outscored 276 to 103. Howard E. Houston was the team captain.

Harvard played its home games at Harvard Stadium in the Allston neighborhood of Boston, Massachusetts.

Schedule

References

Harvard
Harvard Crimson football seasons
Harvard Crimson football
1940s in Boston